Lophoceps alenicola is a moth of the family Sesiidae. It is known from Equatorial Guinea.

References

Sesiidae
Moths of Africa
Moths described in 1913